Wazirabad District (Punjabi and ), is a district that is a part of the Majha region in Punjab, Pakistan. Wazirabad District is bordered by the districts of Gujrat, Sialkot, Mandi Bahauddin, Hafizabad, and Gujranwala. (Currently Wazirabad's district status has been suspended)

Currently, the notification of October 2022 which upgraded the level of Wazirabad from Tehsil to District has been suspended, hence suspending Wazirabad as a district. Which makes it a Tehsil again.

References

Wazirabad District
Districts of Punjab, Pakistan